Teinopalpus is a genus of butterflies in the family Papilionidae.

Taxonomy

The genus contains two species: Teinopalpus aureus (golden kaiser-i-hind) and Teinopalpus imperialis (kaiser-i-hind). Both species have a number of recognised subspecies.

 Teinopalpus aureus
 T. a. aureus
 T. a. hainanensis
 T. a. laotiana
 T. a. nagaoi
 T. a. shinkaii

 Teinopalpus imperialis
 T. i. behludinii
 T. i. colettei
 T. i. gerritesi
 T. i. gillesi
 T. i. herteri
 T. i. imperatrix
 T. i. imperialis
 T. i. miecoae

 
Papilionidae
Butterfly genera
Taxonomy articles created by Polbot